Stuart Turton (born 1980) is an English author and journalist. His first novel, The Seven Deaths of Evelyn Hardcastle (2018) was a bestseller internationally and won a number of awards including the  First Novel Award at the 2018 Costa Book Awards.

Early life 
Turton was born and raised in Widnes, England and educated at The University of Liverpool, where he received a BA (Hons) in English and Philosophy. After graduating, he spent a year working as a teacher in Shanghai, before becoming a technology journalist in London. He moved to Dubai to become a travel journalist, living there for three years until he returned to London to write his first novel.

Career 

Turton's debut novel, The Seven Deaths of Evelyn Hardcastle (released in the US as The 7 1/2 Deaths of Evelyn Hardcastle) won the First Novel Award at the 2018 Costa Book Awards and has sold in 28 languages. Since publication, it has sold over 200,000 copies in the UK. In an interview given to The Guardian, he described writing the book as "just awful".

The Seven Deaths of Evelyn Hardcastle received a number of other accolades. It won Best Novel in the 2018 Books Are My Bag Readers' Awards. That same year, it was shortlisted for a New Writers' Award at the Specsavers National Book Awards, Debut of the Year at the British Book Awards, and longlisted for a New Blood Dagger and Gold Dagger at the Crime Writers' Association Awards.

Val McDermid selected Turton to appear on her New Blood panel at the Theakstons Old Peculier Crime Writing Festival. In 2019, it was shortlisted for Best Debut Novel at the Strand Magazine Critics Awards and longlisted for the Glass Bell Award.

Turton's second novel, The Devil and the Dark Water, was published in October 2020. It won the 2020 Books Are My Bag Fiction Award, and was shortlisted for the Ian Fleming Dagger at the Crime Writers' Association Awards. It was Waterstones Thriller of the Month, and selected for Between the Covers, a seven-part book TV programme on BBC Two hosted by Sara Cox. It has sold in 20 countries.

In December 2020 it was announced that Netflix had bought the rights to a seven-part series adaptation of The Seven Deaths of Evelyn Hardcastle, produced by BBC Studios-owned House Productions, and to be created and written by Sophie Petzal. But in January 2023 Netflix canceled its planned adaptation.

In April 2021, The Devil and the Dark Water was optioned for television by Urban Myth. It will be written by Howard Overman, with Turton serving as an executive producer on the project.

In November 2020, Turton signed a contract to write two more "high-concept" mystery novels for Bloomsbury. He has described them as "nuts".

Bibliography

Novels 

 The Seven Deaths of Evelyn Hardcastle (2018)
 The Devil and the Dark Water (2020)

References

External links 

 Stuart Turton on Twitter

English journalists
English novelists
Costa Book Award winners
People from Widnes
Alumni of the University of Liverpool
Living people
English crime fiction writers
English mystery writers
1980 births